NADPH oxidase 3 is an enzyme that in humans is encoded by the NOX3 gene.

Function 

NADPH oxidases, such as NOX3, are plasma membrane-associated enzymes found in many cell types. They catalyze the production of superoxide by a 1-electron reduction of oxygen, using NADPH as the electron donor.[supplied by OMIM]

References

Further reading